This is a list of notable Bulgarian musicians and singers.

100 Kila
Alexander Raytchev
Alexis Weissenberg
Andrea
Angela Tosheva
Azis
Boris Christoff
Boris Karlov
Christina Morfova
Dara
Daniel Spassov
Desi Slava
Elena Nikolai
Emil Dimitrov
Galina Savova
Gena Dimitrova
Georgi Minchev
Gery-Nikol
Gloria
Iren Dimitrova
Ivan Yanakov
Ivanka Ninova
Ivo Papazov
Julia Tsenova
Kamen Tchanev
Kiril Marichkov
Kremena Stancheva
Krisia Todorova
Kristian Kostov
Lea Ivanova
Lili Ivanova
Ljuba Welitsch
Ludmilla Diakovska
Marius Kurkinski
Mariya Neikova
Milcho Leviev
Milena Slavova
Mira Aroyo
Nayden Todorov
Neva Krysteva
Nicola Ghiuselev
Nicolai Ghiaurov
Pasha Hristova
Petko Staynov
Poli Genova
Preslava
Radka Toneff
Raina Kabaivanska
Ralitsa Tcholakova
Slavi Trifonov
Sonya Yoncheva
Spens
Stefan Valdobrev
Svetla Protich
Theodosii Spassov
Todor Kobakov
Valeri Georgiev
Valya Balkanska
Vasko Vassilev
Vassil Naidenov
Ventsislav Yankov
Vesko Eschkenazy
Vesselina Kasarova
Yildiz Ibrahimova
Yoan Kukuzel
Yuri Boukoff
Sofi Marinova

General sources
 Stoyan Petrov (Magdalena Manolova, Milena Bozhikova, revd) (2001) Bulgaria: Art music. Grove Music Online, Oxford University Press 
 Donna A. Buchanan (2001). Bulgaria: Traditional music. Grove Music Online, Oxford University Press

See also
 List of Bulgarians
 List of Bulgarian actors
 Lists of musicians

Bulgarian
 
Musicians and singers